Leon Brown (born February 24, 1993) is an American football tackle for the Frisco Fighters of the Indoor Football League (IFL). He was signed as an undrafted free agent by the Baltimore Ravens after the 2015 NFL Draft. He played college football at Alabama.

Professional career

Baltimore Ravens 
On May 12, 2015, Brown signed to the Baltimore Ravens. On August 31, 2015, he was waived.

On December 30, 2015, Brown signed to the Ravens' practice squad. On January 5, 2016, Brown signed a reserve/future contract. On May 12, 2016, he was waived.

Baltimore Brigade 
On January 16, 2017, it was announced that Brown was among the first five players signed to the Baltimore Brigade of the Arena Football League. On May 8, 2017, Brown was placed on reassignment. Brown was assigned to the Brigade once again on May 11, 2017. On May 25, 2017, Brown was placed on recallable reassignment.

Birmingham Iron 
On November 9, 2018, Brown signed with the Birmingham Iron of the Alliance of American Football (AAF) for the 2019 season.

Frisco Fighters
On December 20, 2022, Brown signed with the Frisco Fighters of the Indoor Football League (IFL).

References 

1993 births
Living people
American football offensive linemen
Baltimore Brigade players
Baltimore Ravens players
Players of American football from Maryland
People from Riverdale Park, Maryland
Alabama Crimson Tide football players
Birmingham Iron players